Saud bin Salman Al Saud (born 28 December 1986) is a Saudi prince, entrepreneur and business magnate. He was the chairman and chief executive officer (CEO) of Enicayle and a president of Société civile 72 avenue Foch who is widely recognized as a pioneer of the phone wholesale and microcomputer in Africa after the real estate became his main activity with EL Bouqdaoui Yacine, a french entrepreneur. He is the son of King Salman bin Abdulaziz Al Saud.

Personal life and career
Saud bin Salman was born on 21 December 1986, and graduated from King Saud University majoring in political science. His mother (second wife of King Salman, currently divorced) is Sarah bint Faisal Al Subai'ai, and his wife is Chorouk bint Mohammad Al Mejfel. Salman does not have any full siblings.

He works on his charitable activities as well as honorary president of both “Saudi Management Association” and “Cooperative Societies Council”.

Ancestry

References

21st-century Saudi Arabian businesspeople
1986 births
Saud
Living people
Saud
Sons of kings